Jehyve Floyd (born June 27, 1997) is an American professional basketball player for Galatasaray Nef of the Basketbol Süper Ligi (BSL). Born and raised in Parlin, New Jersey, Floyd played high school basketball at Sayreville War Memorial. He played college basketball for the Holy Cross Crusaders, where he was named Patriot League Defensive Player of the Year in both 2018 and 2019.

High school career
Floyd began his high school tenure at Sayreville War Memorial High School, in Sayreville, New Jersey for head coach John Wojcik. During his high school career, Floyd was selected as Sayreville's Breakout Player of the Year in 2014 and earned first team All-Conference honors while serving as team captain during his senior season.

College career
After high school, Floyd committed to Holy Cross under head coach Bill Carmody. During his tenure with the Crusaders, he established himself as one of the best defensive players in the Patriot League, being inducted to the All-Defensive team two times. He was also selected as the Patriot League Defensive Player of the Year both in 2018 and 2019.

As a senior, Floyd averaged 12.9 points, 6.1 rebounds, 3.5 assists and 2.4 blocked shots per game. He shot 67% from the field, which ranked third in the NCAA Division I.

He is the all-time leader in career field goal percentage (.656) in the Patriot League and also finished second all-time at Holy Cross in blocked shots (193).

Professional career
After going undrafted in the 2019 NBA draft, Floyd joined MHP Riesen Ludwigsburg of the Basketball Bundesliga. He left the team before appearing in a single game.

Larisa
On September 13, 2019, he joined Larisa of the Greek Basket League. In 20 games, Floyd averaged 5.1 points, 5 rebounds and 2.2 blocks per game, leading the league in blocks (44).

Promitheas Patras
On July 30, 2020, he signed with Promitheas Patras of the same league.

Hapoel Gilboa Galil
On October 12 of the same year, Floyd signed with Hapoel Gilboa Galil of the Israeli Basketball Premier League. He averaged 11.4 points and 7.4 rebounds per game. In 2020–21 he was second in the Israel Basketball Premier League in blocked shots per game (1.7), eighth in offensive rebounds per game (2.5), and lead the league in two-point shot percentage (74.2 per cent).

Panathinaikos
On July 19, 2021, Floyd signed with EuroLeague club Panathinaikos, making his return to Greece.

Fenerbahçe Beko
On December 20, 2021, Floyd transferred to Turkish club Fenerbahçe for the rest of the season.

Galatasaray Nef
On June 24, 2022, he has signed a 1+1 year contract with Galatasaray Nef of the Basketbol Süper Ligi (BSL).

On July 3, 2022, the Phoenix Suns released their 2022 Las Vegas Summer League roster which included Floyd.

In the statement made by Galatasaray Nef on 13 March 2023, it was announced that the contract with Floyd was terminated by mutual agreement.

Honours
Greek Basketball Super Cup: (2021)

References

External links
Holy Cross Crusaders bio

1997 births
Living people
21st-century African-American sportspeople
African-American basketball players
American expatriate basketball people in Greece
American expatriate basketball people in Israel
American expatriate basketball people in Turkey
American men's basketball players
Basketball players from New Jersey
Centers (basketball)
Fenerbahçe men's basketball players
Galatasaray S.K. (men's basketball) players
Hapoel Gilboa Galil Elyon players
Israeli Basketball Premier League players
Larisa B.C. players
Holy Cross Crusaders men's basketball players
Panathinaikos B.C. players
People from Sayreville, New Jersey
Power forwards (basketball)
Promitheas Patras B.C. players
Sayreville War Memorial High School alumni
Sportspeople from Middlesex County, New Jersey